Richard J. Haier is an American psychologist who has researched a neural basis for human intelligence, psychometrics, general intelligence, and sex and intelligence.

Haier is currently a Professor Emeritus in the Pediatric Neurology Division of the School of Medicine at University of California, Irvine. He has a Ph.D. from Johns Hopkins University. He is also the editor-in-chief of the journal Intelligence since 2016.

In 1994, he was one of 52 signatories on "Mainstream Science on Intelligence," an editorial written by the American psychologist Linda Gottfredson and published in the Wall Street Journal, which summarized findings from intelligence research, especially as they related to issues raised in The Bell Curve. Haier later discussed the controversy surrounding the book in a 2022 interview on Lex Fridman's podcast.

He has worked with Rex Jung on the parieto-frontal integration theory (P-FIT) which uses neuro-imaging to examine the neuroscience of intelligence.

Selected bibliography

Books

Journal articles

References

External links
 Personal website
 The Intelligent Brain Lectures
 
 
  (See Lex Fridman.)

Living people
Academic journal editors
21st-century American psychologists
Intelligence researchers
Johns Hopkins University alumni
Race and intelligence controversy
University of California, Irvine faculty
Year of birth missing (living people)